Layzell Gyroplanes Ltd was a British aircraft manufacturer based in Quedgeley, Gloucester and founded by Gary Layzell. The company specialized in the manufacture of autogyros in the form of kits for amateur construction.

During its time in business Layzell produced two designs, the Layzell Cricket designed by Peter Lovegrove, produced by Layzell from 2005, and the Layzell Merlin from Scottish designer Jim Montgomery.

Layzell remained in business through 2011, although by July 2012 the company website had been removed from the internet.

Aircraft

References

External links
Former location of official website
Layzell Gyroplanes website archives on Archive.org

 
Defunct aircraft manufacturers of the United Kingdom
Autogyros
Homebuilt aircraft